GDFR may refer to:

 Global Digital Format Registry, in digital preservation
 "G.D.F.R.", a 2014 song by Flo Rida